Roberto Castillo Sandoval (born November 14, 1957, in Santiago, Chile) is a Chilean author, translator and professor of Spanish and Comparative Literature at Haverford College in Haverford, Pennsylvania. He has a Ph.D. and A.M. in Romance Languages and Literatures from Harvard University (1992 and 1987, respectively), an M.A. in Latin American Literature from Vanderbilt University (1985) and a B.A. in Sociology from Kenyon College (1982).

His latest novel, La novela del corazón (Laurel Editores, 2022) is loosely based on the history of heart transplants in Chile in the 1960's.

His novel in the form of fictional obituaries, Muertes imaginarias (Laurel Editores, 2020) was named "Best of 2020 Fiction Book" by the Chilean Art Critics Circle.

His novel Muriendo por la dulce patria mía (Planeta, 1998; republished, with a new version and postscript by Laurel Editores, 2017) is a fictional account centered on Chilean heavyweight boxer Arturo Godoy.

A collection of essays and chronicles, Antípodas. Ensayos y crónicas (Cuarto Propio, 2014) was one of three finalists for the Santiago Municipal Prize in the Essay category, 2015.

Among his translations from English into Spanish are Herman Melville's Bartleby, the Scrivener and Nathaniel Hawthorne's Wakefield, published by Hueders in 2017 and 2019, respectively.

In addition, he has published scholarly essays on Latin American colonial and contemporary literature, short fiction, poetry, travel chronicles, and literary and opinion columns for Chilean, Argentinean, American, and Spanish print and web media.

He maintains the blog Antípodas, which hosts a selection of his essays, fiction, and translation work.

References

Castillo Sandoval Roberto and Andrea Goic. Muertes Imaginarias. Laurel 2020.

Bibliography
La novela del corazón. Santiago, Chile: Laurel Editores, 2022. 
Muertes imaginarias. Santiago, Chile: Laurel Editores, 2020. 
"The Laws of motion." in The Kenyon Review, May-June 2019.
Wakefield. Santiago, Chile: Hueders Editores, 2019. 
Muriendo por la dulce patria mía. Santiago, Chile: Laurel Editores, 2017. 
Bartleby, el escribano. Una historia de Wall Street. Santiago, Chile: Hueders Editores, 2017. 
Antípodas. Ensayos y crónicas. Santiago: Chile, Cuarto Propio Editores, 2014. 
Muriendo por la dulce patria mía Santiago, Chile: Planeta, 1998. 

1957 births
Living people
Chilean male writers
Kenyon College alumni
Vanderbilt University alumni
Harvard University alumni
Haverford College faculty
Place of birth missing (living people)